The Situation can refer to:

 The Situation (film), a 2006 film
 Michael Sorrentino (born 1982), known as "The Situation", American television personality
 The Situation, the former name of the MSNBC show Tucker
 "The Situation", a song by The Black Eyed Peas from the album The Beginning

See also
 Situation (disambiguation)